Tablazo Formation may refer to:
 Tablazo Formation, Ecuador, a Middle Pleistocene geologic formation in Ecuador
 Tablazo Formation, Colombia, an Aptian to Albian geologic formation in Colombia
 Máncora Tablazo Formation, a Late Pliocene to Early Pleistocene geologic formation in Peru